This is a list of Master's degree programs with formal specializations / concentrations in Bioethics, by country. Degree programs may include, for example, Master of Arts, Master of Science, Master of Health Science and Master of Bioethics. These may be dedicated programs, or specializations within other disciplinary programs, such as philosophy, law or health sciences, and refer to bioethics, health ethics, healthcare ethics, etc.

Topics in Bioethics may be the subject of study within many disciplines in the Humanities, Law, the Social sciences and Health sciences, and not exclusively within dedicated bioethics programs. They may also be associated with Bioethics Centers and Institutes. Here are listed only those programs with formal bioethics designations or concentrations.

Africa

Nigeria 

 University of Ibadan - Master of Science and Master of Philosophy (MPhil) in Bioethics

Australasia

Australia 

 Monash University - Master of Bioethics
University of Sydney - Master of Bioethics

New Zealand 

 University of Otago - Master of Bioethics and Health Law

Asia

Hong Kong 
 University of Hong Kong - Master of Laws in Medical Ethics and Law

Indonesia 

 Gadjah Mada University - Master of Science in Bioethics

Pakistan 

 Aga Khan University - Master of Bioethics

Philippines 

 University of the Philippines Manila - Master of Science in Bioethics

Europe

Austria 

 https://www.jku.at - Professional Master of Ethics (Medical Ethic)

Belgium 

KU Leuven - Master in Bioethics
Université catholique de Louvain - Master in Ethics, Biomedical ethics and Bioethics specialization
Université libre de Bruxelles - Master in Ethics, Bioethics concentration

France 

Aix-Marseille University - Master in Ethics: Ethics, Science, Health, Society
École des hautes études en santé publique & Université de Rennes 1 - Master Law, Health and Ethics
University of Paris (2019) - Master in Ethics: Research Ethics and Bioethics
University of Lorraine - Master in Ethics: Ethics of Health, Public Health and New Technologies
University of Nantes - Master in Ethics: Autonomous Decisions and Practices; Autonomy, Responsibility and Healthcare
University of Paris-Saclay - Master in Ethics: Ethics, Science, Health and Society
University of Paris-Est Marne-la-Vallée - Master in Ethics: Applied Medical and Hospital Ethics 
University of Strasbourg - Master in Ethics and Society
University of Toulouse-Jean-Jaurès - Master in Heath Ethics and Research (philosophy, medicine, law)

Greece 

 Democritus University of Thrace - Master in Bioethics
University of Crete - Master of Arts in Bioethics

Ireland 

University College Cork - Master of Science in End-of-Life Healthcare Ethics
Royal College of Surgeons in Ireland - Master of Science in Healthcare Ethics and Law

Spain 

Universidad Pontificia Comillas - Master in Bioethics

Netherlands 

University of Utrecht - Master in Applied Ethics
VU University Amsterdam - Master's specialization in Philosophy, Bioethics and Health

Spain 

King Juan Carlos University - Master in Bioethics
Universidad Católica San Antonio de Murcia - Master in Bioethics
University of Barcelona - Master in Bioethics and Law
University of La Laguna - Master in Bioethics and Health Law
Institut Borja of Bioethics- Ramon Llull University - Master in Bioethics

United Kingdom 

Keele University
Master of Arts in Medical Ethics and Law
Master of Arts in Medical Ethics and Palliative Care
King's College London 
Master of Science in Bioethics & Society
Master of Science in Global Health & Social Justice
Master of Arts in Medical Ethics and Law
Nottingham Trent University - LL.M. in Health Law and Ethics
St Mary's University, Twickenham - Bioethics and Medical Law
University College London
Master of Arts in Philosophy, Politics and Economics of Health
Master of Arts in Health Humanities
University of Edinburgh - LL.M. in Medical Law & Ethics
University of Leeds - Master of Arts in Biomedical and Healthcare Ethics
University of Manchester
LL.M. in Healthcare Ethics and Law
Master of Arts in Healthcare Ethics and Law
University of Oxford - Master of Studies (MSt) in Practical Ethics

North America

Canada 

 McGill University - Specialization in Bioethics: Master of Arts (Philosophy, Religious Studies), LL.M. (Law), M.Sc (Medicine)
 Memorial University of Newfoundland - Master of Health Ethics (MHE)
 Université de Montréal 
 Master of Arts in Bioethics
 Master of Biomedical Science, clinical ethics option
 University of Ottawa - LL.M. with Concentration in Health Law, Policy and Ethics
University of Toronto
 Master of Health Sciences in Bioethics
 LL.M., M.A., M.HSc., M.Sc., M.N., M.PH. bioethics specialization

Mexico 

 Colegio de Bioética de Nuevo León - Master of Bioethics
Universidad Anáhuac México - Master of Bioethics

United States

Albany Medical College - Master of Science in Bioethics
Albert Einstein College of Medicine - Master of Science in Bioethics
Case Western Reserve University - Master of Arts in Bioethics and Medical Humanities
Clarkson University & Icahn School of Medicine at Mount Sinai - Master of Science in Bioethics
Creighton University - Master of Science in Health Care Ethics
Columbia University - Master of Science in Bioethics
Drew University - Master of Medical Humanities
Duke University - Master of Arts in Bioethics & Science Policy
Duquesne University - Master of Arts in Healthcare Ethics
Emory University - Master of Arts in Bioethics
Fordham University - Master of Arts in Ethics and Society
George Washington University - Master of Arts in Philosophy and Social Policy, concentration in Bioethics and Health Policy
Harvard Medical School - Master of Bioethics
Indiana University – Purdue University Indianapolis - Master of Arts in Philosophy, Bioethics concentration
Johns Hopkins University - Master of Bioethics
Kansas City University of Medicine and Biosciences - Dual diploma, Doctor of Osteopathic Medicine and Master of Arts in Bioethics
Lake Erie College of Osteopathic Medicine - Master of Science in Biomedical Ethics
Loma Linda University - Master of Arts in Bioethics
Loyola Marymount University - Master of Arts in Bioethics
Loyola University Chicago - Master of Arts in Bioethics & Health Policy
Medical College of Wisconsin - Master of Arts in Bioethics
New York University - Master of Arts in Bioethics
Northwestern University - Master of Arts in Medical Humanities & Bioethics
Ohio State University - Master of Arts in Bioethics
St. Thomas University - Master of Science in Bioethics
Stony Brook University - Master of Arts in Bioethics
Temple University - Master of Arts in Urban Bioethics
Trinity International University - Master of Arts in Bioethics
Tulane University - Master of Science in Bioethics and Medical Humanities
University of Louisville - Master of Arts in Interdisciplinary Studies, concentration in Bioethics and Medical Humanities
University of Mary - Master of Science in Bioethics
University of Minnesota - Master of Arts in Bioethics
University of Pennsylvania
Master of Bioethics
Master of Science in Medical Ethics
University of Pittsburgh - Interdisciplinary Master of Arts in Bioethics
University of Rochester - Master of Science in Medical Humanities
University of Texas Medical Branch - Master of Arts in Medical Humanities
University of Washington - Master of Arts in Bioethics
Vanderbilt University - Master of Arts in Medicine, Health and Society
Wake Forest University - Master of Arts in Bioethics

South America

Argentina 

 FLACSO Latin American School of Social Sciences (Argentina) - Master in Bioethics
 Universidad del Museo Social Argentino - Master in Bioethics
 National University of Córdoba - Master in Bioethics

Colombia 

 El Bosque University - Master in Bioethics
 Pontifical Xavierian University - Master in Bioethics

Chile 

 Pontifical Catholic University of Chile - Master in Bioethics
 University of Chile - Master in Bioethics
 Universidad del Desarrollo - Master in Bioethics

Ecuador

Pontificia Universidad Católica del Ecuador /
Facultad de ciencias filosófico - teológicas/
Maestría en Bioética/
https://www.puce.edu.ec/portal/carreras/maestria-en-bioetica/

Sources 

 The Hastings Center - Graduate Programs
American Society for Bioethics and Humanities - Bioethics and Humanities Academic Programs
Bioethics.com - Academic Degree and Certificate Programs
 List of Canadian bioethics programs

References 

Postgraduate schools
Bioethics